The Wizard World Columbus Comic Con, formerly known as Mid-Ohio Con and then the Wizard World Ohio Comic Con, was a comic book convention held during the fall in Columbus, Ohio, United States, at the Greater Columbus Convention Center. Initially held in early November, from 1994–2007 the Mid-Ohio Con took place on the first weekend after Thanksgiving. Normally a two-day event (Saturday and Sunday), in 2012 it expanded to three days (Friday through Sunday).

The Mid-Ohio Con was founded in 1980. In 2010, the convention was acquired by Wizard Entertainment.

History 
The Mid-Ohio Con was founded in 1980 by voice actor and announcer Roger A. Price. Over the years, Price used the show to raise money for various charities (frequently the March of Dimes), raising a total of over $1,000,000. (Price himself was a polio survivor.) Initially, the convention was held in various venues throughout central Ohio before settling in Columbus, where it has been located since 1993.

The 1985 show, held at the Richland County Fairgrounds in Mansfield, Ohio, featured the announcement of John Byrne's relaunch of the Superman books. (Byrne made regular appearances at the convention from 1981–2004.) In 1988 small press publisher Bob Corby premiered the first issue of Oh, Comics!, a 40-page minicomic featuring the work of twelve Ohio small press artists. Corby produced new issues of Oh, Comics! in conjunction with the Mid-Ohio Con for the next twenty years, ultimately publishing the work of over 100 creators ranging in age from ten to sixty.

By 1993, the show had moved to the Hyatt Regency and Greater Columbus Convention Center. The 1994 show featured an auction and a costume contest/dance party, both benefiting the Columbus Ronald McDonald House. The 1996 show featured a "Small Press Expo." The 1997 show moved to Columbus' Adam's Mark Hotel and featured a Tony Isabella roast. The 1998 show was promoted in the panels of Tom Batiuk's syndicated newspaper strip, Funky Winkerbean, in which one of the characters journeyed to the show to search for a long-lost Hopalong Cassidy comic book.

In 2000, the show expanded and moved to the Hilton Columbus Hotel at Easton Town Center. The 2002 and 2003 conventions featured special karaoke parties hosted by actor Andy Hallett. Both parties raised money for the American Diabetes Association.

The 2005 edition of the show, held at the Hilton Columbus Hotel at Easton Town Center, later became known for being the site of a sexual assault by Comic Book Legal Defense Fund (CBLDF) director Charles Brownstein. The incident was reported to the police at the time, and 15 years later led to Brownstein's resignation from the CBLDF.

In 2006, the Mid-Ohio Con increased in size again and moved to Battelle Hall, part of the Greater Columbus Convention Center.

In January 2008, founder Price announced he was retiring, and his company R.A.P. Promotions would entertain offers for the convention. In May 2008, the show was acquired by James and Bill Henry of GCX Holdings and merged with Jamie and Teresa Colegrove's Ohio Comic Con. By then, the show had been struggling a bit, and GCX invigorated new life into it, as well as working closely with Columbus-area comics creators.

In November 2010 the Mid-Ohio Con was acquired by Wizard Entertainment for $77,500. In 2012 it was renamed the Wizard World Ohio Comic Con.

For 2015, as Wizard was expanding further into Ohio with the new Wizard World Cleveland Comic Con, the Columbus show was renamed the Wizard World Columbus Comic Con.

The last scheduled Wizard World Ohio Comic Con was held in October 2019; no new dates have been scheduled.

Dates and locations

Events
Along with panels, seminars, and workshops with comic book professionals, there are portfolio review sessions with top comic book and video game companies, and such evening events as a costume contest. Traditional events include hours of programming on all aspects of comic books and pop culture. For many years, comics writer/editor Tony Isabella was the show's panel programming director.

A popular event for a number of years (c. 1995–2001) was the panel game show Comic Book Squares, based on Hollywood Squares. In Comic Book Squares, hosted by Joe Edkins, a group of comics industry "celebrities" sat in a squarish setting, answering comic book and guest-related trivia questions while contestants (selected members of the audience) won prizes.

Like most comic book conventions, the Ohio Comic Con features a large floorspace for exhibitors, including comic book dealers and collectibles merchants. The Ohio Comic Con includes an autograph area, as well as an Artists' Alley where comics artists (as well as writers, models, and celebrities) sign autographs and/or sell or do free sketches.

Criticism 
With the show's 2010 acquisition by Wizard Entertainment, according to comics writer Dara Naraghi, complaints arose almost immediately about the change in atmosphere. Whereas once the show was known as relaxed and congenial, and guests were easily accessible to fans, the Wizard-run show forged an aesthetic that Naraghi found to be louder, brasher, and more expensive. Writer J. J. Ulm of the Columbus Free Press had similar complaints about the 2014 show.

In popular culture 
Mid-Ohio Con founder Roger A. Price has appeared as a comic book character in Marvel Comics. In The Star Brand #12, written and penciled by frequent Mid-Ohio Con guest  John Byrne, Price is introduced as a Red Cross worker (using a cane, married to Jane Price, and living in Mansfield, Ohio, as in real life) who also claims to be "director of the north central Ohio division of the March of Dimes" (a reference to the Mid-Ohio Con's ongoing support for the March of Dimes). The Price character dies in The Star Brand #14 but is later reborn as a temporary holder of the Star Brand. Altogether, the character appears in six issues of The Star Brand.

See also 
 Small Press and Alternative Comics Expo

References

External links 
 

Comics conventions in the United States
Multigenre conventions
Recurring events established in 1980
Culture of Columbus, Ohio
Conventions in Ohio
1980 establishments in Ohio